Regina Paula Martins Morelenbaum (born July 31, 1962) is a Brazilian singer, born in Rio de Janeiro. She and her husband Jaques Morelenbaum were in the band that toured with Antonio Carlos Jobim from 1984 to 1994.

In addition to Jobim's group, Paula Morelenbaum has been part of Quarteto Jobim-Morelenbaum, with her husband Jaques, Jobim's son Paulo, and his son Daniel. She has also been in the trio Morelenbaum2/Sakamoto, also with her husband, and with Japanese composer/keyboardist Ryuichi Sakamoto.

Selected discography
 Céu da Boca – Céu da Boca, 1981 LP (Polygram) 
 show habia, Japan with A.C. JOBIM,1987
 Céu da Boca – Baratotal, 1982 LP (Polygram)
 Nova Banda – Amazonas Família Jobim 1991 (MoviePlay/Som Livre)
 Paula Morelenbaum – Paula Morelenbaum, 1992 (Independente/Camerati)
 Quarteto Jobim-Morelenbaum – Quarteto Jobim-Morelenbaum, 1999 (Velas/Sony Music)
 Céu da Boca – Millennium, 2000 (Universal Music)
 Morelenbaum²/Sakamoto – Casa, 2001 (Kab/Universal Music)
 Morelenbaum²/Sakamoto – Live in Tokyo 2001, 2001 (Warner Music Japan)
 Morelenbaum²/Sakamoto – A Day in New York, 2003 (Kab/Universal Music/Sony Classical) 
 Paula Morelenbaum – Berimbaum, 2004 (Mirante/Farol Musica/Universal Music)
 Paula Morelenbaum – Telecoteco, 2008
 SWR Bigband & Paula Morelenbaum – Bossarenova, 2009
 Paula & Donato – Água, 2010

References 

1962 births
Living people
20th-century Brazilian women singers
20th-century Brazilian singers
Musicians from Rio de Janeiro (city)
21st-century Brazilian women singers
21st-century Brazilian singers